The Rev. James Aloysius Burns, C.S.C. (February 13, 1867; September 9, 1940) was an American priest and President of the University of Notre Dame from 1919 to 1922. He was crucial in transforming Notre Dame into a national research university. He was professor of chemistry at Notre Dame from 1895 to 1900. He was a theorist of education, and wrote numerous books on the topic.

Early life
James Aloysius Burns was born in Michigan City, Indiana February 13, 1867. After attending Notre Dame University, he entered the Congregation of the Holy Cross in 1888. He was a teacher at Sacred Heart College in Watertown, Wisconsin, and was ordained in 1893. He became a  professor at Notre Dame in 1890, and served as rector of Sorin Hall.

President of the University of Notre Dame
Rev. Burns was Notre Dame's greatest theorist of education, and was pivotal in moving the University towards its academic and scholastic prominence. Immediately after Burns became president, he divided the University into four distinct colleges: Arts and Letters, Science, Engineering, and Law. In 1919 he eliminated the prep school to make more room on campus for college students. Focusing on academic matters, added no new buildings to the campus during his tenure, but in his final year set the foundations for a large expansion of the University. He began a campaign to raise $750,000, which, if raised secured $250,000 from the Rockefeller Foundation and $75,000 from the Carnegie foundation. He dramatically upgraded the Law School, and established the University's first endowment and a board of lay advisors to oversee it. In 1922 Burns decided not to serve another term and to devote his time to fund- raising activities. During this endeavor, he raised a decent amount of money, but more importantly was crucial in spreading the name and recognition of the University.

Burns was one of the founders of the Catholic College Conference, and founder and vice-president of the Catholic Education Association. He was a contributor, especially on educational themes, to many Catholic magazines; and to the Catholic Encyclopedia''.

He died September 9, 1940.

References

External links

Presidents of the University of Notre Dame
20th-century American Roman Catholic priests
Congregation of Holy Cross
1867 births
1940 deaths
University of Notre Dame faculty
Contributors to the Catholic Encyclopedia